Phil Harris (born 9 April 1983) is a retired English mixed martial artist. A professional competitor from 2003 until 2014, he competed for the UFC, Cage Rage, and BAMMA.

Mixed martial arts career

Early career
After compiling a record of 17–9 (1), Harris signed with BAMMA in 2010, making his debut against Irish featherweight Steve McCombe at BAMMA 2, winning via unanimous decision. He followed that up with another decision victory over Neil Seery at BAMMA 3. After a 21-month layoff, Harris dropped two weight classes to take on Canadian grappler Remi Morvan at Cage Warriors 46, winning by triangle armbar at 4:21 of round 1, his first submission win since 2007. Less than a month later, he took on TUF 14 contestant Casey Dyer at Cage Warriors: Fight Night 4, notching his fifth consecutive win with a unanimous decision.

Ultimate Fighting Championship
On 16 August 2012, Harris was signed by the Ultimate Fighting Championship. He made his UFC debut against fellow grappler Darren Uyenoyama at UFC on FX 5 on 5 October 2012, replacing an injured Louis Gaudinot. Harris was submitted in the second round with a rear naked choke.

Harris next faced Ulysses Gomez on 16 February 2013 at UFC on Fuel TV: Barão vs. McDonald. Harris won the bout via unanimous decision.

Harris was expected to face John Lineker on 3 August 2013 at UFC 163, but Harris suffered a fractured orbital bone in training and he was replaced by José Maria.

The bout with Lineker was rescheduled for 26 October 2013 at UFC Fight Night 30. Harris lost the fight by first-round TKO.

Harris faced Louis Gaudinot at UFC Fight Night 37. He lost the fight via submission in the first round. However, on 20 June 2014, the loss was changed to a No Contest after it was revealed Gaudinot had failed his drug test.

On 5 April 2014, Harris was released from the UFC after losing two fights in a row.

On the same day that Harris was released from the UFC, 5 April 2014, it was announced that Harris had signed an exclusive five-fight deal with Cage Warriors. Harris was expected to face Kurban Gadzhiev on 18 April 2014 in the main event of Cage Warriors Fight Night 11. However Kurban Gadzhiev pulled out of the fight due to illness, thus scraping the fight.

Harris faced Neil Seery in a rematch on 19 July 2014 at UFC Fight Night 46. He lost the fight via unanimous decision.

On 31 December 2014, Harris announced his retirement from mixed martial arts.

Mixed martial arts record

|-
| Loss
| align=center| 22–12 (2)
| Neil Seery
| Decision (unanimous)
| UFC Fight Night: McGregor vs. Brandao
| 
| align=center| 3
| align=center| 5:00
| Dublin, Ireland
| 
|-
| NC
| align=center| 22–11 (2)
| Louis Gaudinot
| NC (overturned loss)
| UFC Fight Night: Gustafsson vs. Manuwa
| 
| align=center| 1
| align=center| 1:13
| London, England
| 
|-
| Loss
| align=center| 22–11 (1)
| John Lineker
| TKO (punches)
| UFC Fight Night: Machida vs. Munoz
| 
| align=center| 1
| align=center| 2:51
| Manchester, England
| 
|-
| Win
| align=center| 22–10 (1)
| Ulysses Gomez
| Decision (unanimous)
| UFC on Fuel TV: Barão vs. McDonald
| 
| align=center| 3 
| align=center| 5:00
| London, England
| 
|-
| Loss
| align=center| 21–10 (1)
| Darren Uyenoyama
| Submission (rear naked choke)
| UFC on FX: Browne vs. Bigfoot
| 
| align=center| 2
| align=center| 3:38
| Minneapolis, Minnesota, United States
| 
|-
| Win
| align=center| 21–9 (1)
| Casey Dyer
| Decision (unanimous)
| Cage Warriors Fight Night 4
| 
| align=center| 3
| align=center| 5:00
| Dubai, United Arab Emirates
| 
|-
| Win
| align=center| 20–9 (1)
| Remi Morvan
| Submission (triangle armbar)
|  Cage Warriors: 46
| 
| align=center| 1
| align=center| 4:22
| Kyiv, Ukraine
| 
|-
| Win
| align=center| 19–9 (1)
| Neil Seery
| Decision (unanimous)
| BAMMA 3
| 
| align=center| 3
| align=center| 5:00
| Birmingham, England
| 
|-
| Win
| align=center| 18–9 (1)
| Steve McCombe
| Decision (unanimous)
| BAMMA 2
| 
| align=center| 3
| align=center| 5:00
| London, England
| 
|-
| Win
| align=center| 17–9 (1)
| Mourad Benshegir
| Decision
| Atlas Fighting Challenge
| 
| align=center| 3
| align=center| 5:00
| Birmingham, England
| 
|-
| Loss
| align=center| 16–9 (1)
| Ashleigh Grimshaw
| TKO (punches)
| FX3: England vs. Germany
| 
| align=center| 1
| align=center| 0:46
| Reading, England
| 
|-
| Loss
| align=center| 16–8 (1)
| Michael Leonard
| Submission (triangle choke)
| Cage Rage Contenders: Dynamite
| 
| align=center| 1
| align=center| 1:25
| Dublin, Ireland
| 
|-
| NC
| align=center| 16–7 (1)
| Michal Hamrsmid
| No Contest
| Cage Fight Series: D-Day
| 
| align=center| 1
| align=center| N/A
| England
| 
|-
| Win
| align=center| 16–7
| Scott Jansen
| Submission (rear-naked choke)
| UK-1 Fight Night
| 
| align=center| N/A
| align=center| N/A
| England
| 
|-
| Win
| align=center| 15–7
| Nayeb Hezam
| Submission (achilles lock)
| Fight First MMA
| 
| align=center| 1
| align=center| 1:32
| London, England
| 
|-
| Win
| align=center| 14–7
| Darren Russell
| Submission (armbar)
| UK Mixed Martial Arts Championship 18
| 
| align=center| 1
| align=center| 2:25
| Essex, England
| 
|-
| Loss
| align=center| 13–7
| Micky Young
| TKO (corner stoppage)
| Ultimate Fighting Revolution 7
| 
| align=center| 1
| align=center| N/A
| Belfast, Northern Ireland
| 
|-
| Loss
| align=center| 13–6
| David Smyth
| KO
| Pride & Glory: Drop Zone 4
| 
| align=center| 1
| align=center| 0:37
| Catterick, England
| 
|-
| Win
| align=center| 13–5
| Kamon Rana
| TKO (punches)
| Full Contact Fight Night 3
| 
| align=center| 1
| align=center| N/A
| Bracknell, England
| 
|-
| Win
| align=center| 12–5
| Valdo Menzes
| TKO (punches)
| Absolute Adrenaline: Game Over
| 
| align=center| 2
| align=center| N/A
| Bournemouth, England
| 
|-
| Win
| align=center| 11–5
| Phil Labar
| Submission (rear-naked choke)
| UK-1 Fight Night
| 
| align=center| 1
| align=center| N/A
| Portsmouth, England
| 
|-
| Loss
| align=center| 10–5
| Paul McVeigh
| Submission (triangle choke)
| CWFC: Strike Force 4
| 
| align=center| 3
| align=center| 1:05
| Coventry, England
| 
|-
| Win
| align=center| 10–4
| Valdo Menzes
| TKO (punches)
| FX 3: Battle of Britain
| 
| align=center| 2
| align=center| 1:52
| Reading, England
| 
|-
| Loss
| align=center| 9–4
| José Aldo
| TKO (doctor stoppage)
| UK-1 Fight Night
| 
| align=center| 1
| align=center| N/A
| Portsmouth, England
| 
|-
| Win
| align=center| 9–3
| Christian Schoter
| TKO (corner stoppage)
| UK Storm
| 
| align=center| 1
| align=center| 5:00
| Birmingham, England
| 
|-
| Win
| align=center| 8–3
| Ricky Moore
| Submission (rear-naked choke)
| Anarchy Fight Night
| 
| align=center| 1
| align=center| 4:09
| Birmingham, England
| 
|-
| Win
| align=center| 7–3
| Alex Pullin
| Submission (choke)
| Angrrr Management 1
| 
| align=center| 1
| align=center| N/A
| Somerset, England
| 
|-
| Win
| align=center| 6–3
| Chris Freeborn
| Submission (armbar)
| Full Contact Fight Night 3
| 
| align=center| N/A
| align=center| N/A
| Portsmouth, England
| 
|-
| Win
| align=center| 5–3
| Chris Westwood
| Submission (armbar)
| UK Storm
| 
| align=center| 1
| align=center| 1:25
| Evesham, England
| 
|-
| Loss
| align=center| 4–3
| Luiz Henrique Tosta
| Technical Submission (armbar)
| UK Mixed Martial Arts Championship 8
| 
| align=center| 1
| align=center| 4:52
| Essex, England
| 
|-
| Loss
| align=center| 4–2
| Alex Owen
| Submission (triangle choke)
| Night of Fury
| 
| align=center| 2
| align=center| 3:30
| Merthyr Tydfil, Wales
| 
|-
| Win
| align=center| 4–1
| Dave Campbell
| Submission (armbar)
| UK Mixed Martial Arts Championship 7
| 
| align=center| 3
| align=center| 4:13
| Essex, England
| 
|-
| Loss
| align=center| 3–1
| Mark Chen
| Decision (unanimous)
| UK Mixed Martial Arts Championship 6
| 
| align=center| 3
| align=center| 5:00
| Essex, England
| 
|-
| Win
| align=center| 3–0
| Frank Rivas
| Submission (rear-naked choke)
| Pride & Glory 1
| 
| align=center| 2
| align=center| 1:30
| Cardiff, Wales
| 
|-
| Win
| align=center| 2–0
| Steven Milward
| Submission (rear-naked choke)
| Ultimate Combat 8
| 
| align=center| 2
| align=center| 2:27
| Chippenham, England
| 
|-
| Win
| align=center| 1–0
| Eric Dumas
| Submission (armbar)
| UK Mixed Martial Arts Championship 5
| 
| align=center| 1
| align=center| 3:34
| Essex, England
|

References

External links 
 
Official UFC Profile

1984 births
Living people
English male mixed martial artists
Flyweight mixed martial artists
Mixed martial artists utilizing judo
English male judoka
Sportspeople from Portsmouth
Ultimate Fighting Championship male fighters